Hieropotamon was a town of ancient Bithynia, inhabited in Byzantine times. The name does not occur among ancient authors but is inferred from epigraphic and other evidence.

Its site is located below Tahir, Asiatic Turkey.

References

Populated places in Bithynia
Former populated places in Turkey
Populated places of the Byzantine Empire
History of Ankara Province